Chrysolina oricalcea is a species of broad-shouldered leaf beetle of the family Chrysomelidae, subfamily Chrysomelinae.

Around 9 mm in length, it feeds on several plants of the Apiaceae species.

It is found in most Europe.

External links
 BioLib
 Culex.biol.uni.wroc.pl
 Fauna Europaea
 Bioinfo

Chrysomelinae
Beetles of Europe
Beetles described in 1776
Taxa named by Otto Friedrich Müller